The 2013 Hamilton mayoral election was part of the Hamilton and wider New Zealand local elections. On 12 October 2013, elections were held for the Mayor of Hamilton and other local government roles. The incumbent, Julie Hardaker, ran against seven other candidates and was re-elected with 43.6% of the vote, a 2,911-vote majority over Ewan Wilson who won 35.5%.

Candidates
Eight candidates stood for election:
Chatha Arshad
Tony Dixon
Jack Gielen (The Sovereignty Party)
Ian Hanley
Julie Hardaker
Dave Macpherson
Tim Wikiriwhi (Affordable Waikato)
Ewan Wilson

Campaign
All of the mayoral candidates except Wikiriwhi took part in a debate held at the Waikato Institute of Technology and chaired by Waikato Times editor Jonathan MacKenzie on 10 September 2013. According to Waikato Times editor Daniel Adams, about 200 people attended the debate, and the main issues were water metering and water fluoridation. The Waikato Chamber of Commerce and the Hamilton branch of the Property Council of New Zealand hosted a debate between Hardaker, Wilson and Macpherson on 17 September. The debate was chaired by the Property Council's vice-president Graham Dwyer and was attended by over 100 businesspeople, according to Kashka Tunstall of the Waikato Times.

Opinion polls
A Waikato Times opinion poll completed on 26 August 2013 had Hardaker at 20% support, Wilson 10% and Macpherson 6%, with 49% of voters undecided. A second poll by the Waikato Times, completed on 24 September 2013 showed Hardaker steady at 20% and Wilson and Macpherson moving up to 18% and 8%, respectively. On 28 September, the day that the Waikato Times' second poll was published, Macpherson withdrew from the race and asked his supporters to back Wilson.

Results

Note that blank votes are not included. Swing is compared to 2010 results.

References

2013 elections in New Zealand
Mayoral elections in New Zealand
Politics of Hamilton, New Zealand
October 2013 events in New Zealand